The 1960 NFL expansion draft was the first National Football League (NFL) draft in which a new expansion team, which eventually became known as the Dallas Cowboys, selected its initial players. The NFL awarded Dallas, Texas a franchise to compete for revenue with Lamar Hunt's Dallas Texans of the upstart American Football League. However, the Dallas expansion franchise was approved too late for it to participate in the 1960 NFL draft which had been held on November 30, 1959. Thus, Dallas is the only NFL expansion team to not have had the benefit of a college draft in its first year.

In order for the new franchise to become competitive with existing teams, the league gave them the opportunity to select current players from existing teams. That selection was provided by the expansion draft, held on March 13, 1960. At the time the expansion draft was held, the team was known as the Dallas Rangers; the club was then renamed the Dallas Cowboys six days later to avoid confusion with the Dallas Rangers minor league baseball team. 

In this expansion draft, Dallas chose 36 players from the existing 12 teams.  The NFL also assigned the rights to 1960 NFL draft picks Don Meredith (who had been drafted by the Chicago Bears) and Don Perkins (drafted by the Baltimore Colts) to the Cowboys for a couple of future draft picks. 22 players made the active roster that season.  11 players played only one year with Dallas.  Eight players (including Jack Patera, who was injured early in the 1961 season) played in 1960 and 1961.  The three remaining players from the draft started for several years, including: Bob Fry, Tackle, 1960–64; Jerry Tubbs, Linebacker, 1960–66; and Frank Clarke, Wide Receiver, 1960–67.

Rules of the draft
According to a post on the Professional Football Researcher's Association forum, details have never been released to the public, and thus the exact nature of the expansion draft is unclear.  In his autobiography, Tom Landry stated, “Each team would be allowed to protect twenty-five of the thirty-four men on its roster.  Of the nine remaining names, we could pick only three from each team.”  However, there are at least two mistakes in that statement.  First, the active roster limit at that time was thirty-six, not thirty-four.  Second, there were at least two individuals chosen by Dallas who were not on active rosters at the time of the selections.  Note in particular the selection of Joe Nicely, who was never on an NFL active roster. Thus, it would appear that teams could nominate players from their inactive rosters as well.

Mark Ribowsky: “The Cowboys were permitted to sign three players from each NFL team, choosing from among eleven players left unprotected from each thirty-six man roster in an expansion draft to be held in February.” Again, nothing is said here about players not on the active roster, and Ribowsky has the date wrong.  Perhaps the best conclusion is that teams were allowed to protect twenty-five players, active or inactive, and Dallas could choose from the remainder. 

More from Landry, “ . . . each time we picked a player off the unprotected list, a team could remove another from that list.”

Player selections

See also
 1960 American Football League draft

References

National Football League expansion draft
Expansion Draft, 1960
Dallas Cowboys lists